Laem Son National Park is located in Ranong and Phangnga provinces, Thailand. The marine national park is named after the pines along the cape's shore. It was established in 1983, and is 196,875 rai ~  in size.

The NP is a coastal area with beaches, coral reefs, mangrove swamps, and a rainforest jungle. From the beach at Hat Bang Ben, some of the 20 offshore islands are visible, such as Ko Kam Yai, Ko Kam Noi, Mu Ko Yipun, Ko Khangkhao, and Ko Phayam, while Ko Kam Tok (alternate Ko Ao Khao Khwai) and Ko Kam Yai are not visible from this beach. The islands of Piak Nam Yai and Thao are noted for stone-tool usage by long-tailed macaques. In 2002, the Laemson National Park-Kapoe Estuary-Kra Buri River Estuary area became a designated Ramsar site. Subsequent to the 2004 Indian Ocean earthquake and tsunami, the park headquarters were flattened, and Ao Khao Khwai (Bull Horn Bay) was split into two small islands. A consortium of institutional partners are facilitating a mangrove restoration project at Laem Son.

See also
List of national parks of Thailand
List of Protected Areas Regional Offices of Thailand

References

Geography of Ranong province
Geography of Phang Nga province
National parks of Thailand
Ramsar sites in Thailand
Tourist attractions in Phang Nga province
Tourist attractions in Ranong province
Protected areas established in 1983
1983 establishments in Thailand